Rob Rizzo (born June 5, 1973) is an American former NASCAR driver. In his career, he scored three top-10 finishes in the Craftsman Truck Series, which was the only national touring series he raced in.

NASCAR career

Rizzo made his debut in 1996, running his own Rizzo Racing Ford at Watkins Glen International. He had a top-10 run there, started 6th and finishing 7th. Rizzo qualified for three more races that year, including an 11th place at Infineon Raceway. However, he did not finish the other two races.

Rizzo made a dozen starts in 1997. Once again, he got his best finish of the year in his first start, a 6th-place run at Tucson. However, Rizzo struggled in his other starts, as he only posted three top-20 finishes thereafter.

Rizzo would only make two starts in 1998, as Scot Walters purchased Rizzo's ride. Rizzo, however, ended up with the #98 Liberty Racing Ford team. Rizzo struggled in his first race at Homestead-Miami, finishing 30th after a crash. However, in the next race at Watkins Glen, Rizzo managed another top-10 finish. He started and finished 8th in that event.

Rizzo made his final start in 1999, running one race at Portland International Raceway. He struggled, ending up 21st in that event. He has not raced in NASCAR since.

Marriage
Rizzo married actress Natalia Cigliuti in 2004 but in 2013 it was revealed that they had since divorced. They have a son.

Motorsports career results

NASCAR
(key) (Bold - Pole position awarded by qualifying time. Italics - Pole position earned by points standings or practice time. * – Most laps led.)

Craftsman Truck Series

References

External links
Rob Rizzo Career Stats

Living people
NASCAR drivers
Sportspeople from Providence, Rhode Island
Racing drivers from Rhode Island
American people of Italian descent
1973 births
Place of birth missing (living people)